Kleinia is a genus of African flowering plants in the sunflower family.  Kleinia contains around 50 species and is distributed from the Canary Islands, throughout Tropical Africa to India and Arabia.  It is closely related to the genus Senecio but is distinguished primarily by having succulent stems and/or leaves.

Kleinia commemorates Dr Jacob Theodor Klein, a German botanist.

Species

formerly included
 Senecio articulatus (L.f.) Sch. Bip.
Kleinia articulata  (L.f.) Haw.
 Senecio radicans (L.f.) Sch. Bip.
Kleinia radicans  Haw. ex DC.
 Porophyllum ruderale subsp. ruderale 
Kleinia ruderalis  Jacq.
 Stevia selloi (Spreng.) B.L.Rob.
Kleinia selloi  Spreng

References

 
Asteraceae genera
Flora of Africa
Taxonomy articles created by Polbot
Taxa named by Philip Miller